An Evening's Love, or The Mock Astrologer is a comedy in prose by John Dryden.  It was first performed before Charles II and Queen Catherine by the King's Company at the Theatre Royal on Bridges Street, London, on Friday, 12 June 1668. Samuel Pepys saw the play on 20 June of that year, but didn't like it; in his Diary he called it "very smutty."

The play was first  published in 1671 by Henry Herringman; Dryden dedicated the work to William Cavendish, Duke of Newcastle.

Sources
Dryden's sources for An Evening's Love include Thomas Corneille's comedy Le Feint Astrologue, Madeleine de Scudéry's novel Ibrahim, ou l'Illustre Bassa, and Calderón's comedy El Astrologo fingido, as well as several other French, Spanish, Italian, and English works.

Plot
The action of the play takes place in Madrid on the last night before Lent, 1665, and involves two young English gentlemen, Wildblood and Bellamy, and their comic servant Maskall, who fall in love with two beautiful young Spanish ladies, Donna Theodosia and Donna Jacinta, and their clever servant Beatrix.

Cast
The original production featured Charles Hart as Wildblood, Michael Mohun as Bellamy, Nell Gwyn as Jacinta, Nicholas Burt as Don Lopez, William Wintershall as Don Alonzo, Robert Shatterell as Maskal, Edward Lydall as  Don Melchor de Guzman, Elizabeth Boutell as Donna Theodosia, Anne Marshall as Aurelia, and Mary Knep as Beatrix.

References

Bibliography
 Canfield, J. Douglas. Tricksters and Estates: On the Ideology of Restoration Comedy. University Press of Kentucky, 2014.
 Van Lennep, W. The London Stage, 1660-1800: Volume One, 1660-1700. Southern Illinois University Press, 1960.

1668 plays
Fiction set in 1665
English Restoration plays
Plays by John Dryden
West End plays
Restoration comedy
Adaptations of works by Pedro Calderón de la Barca
Charles II of England
Catherine of Braganza
Plays set in Spain
Works based on multiple works